Mikkel Hyllegaard (born 16 May 1999) is a Danish professional footballer who plays for SønderjyskE in the Danish 1st Division.

Club career
Born in Odense, Hyllegaard started his senior career at SfB-Oure FA in the Denmark Series, the fifth tier of the Danish football league system, where he developed into a prolific goalscorer. In the 2017–18 season, he scored 23 goals as he led the league in scoring.

On 28 December 2019, Odense Boldklub (OB) signed Hyllegaard to a three-year contract. He made his debut as a 64th-minute substitute against Brøndby IF on 16 January 2020.

On 2 June 2022 it was confirmed, that Hyllegaard had signed a deal until June 2025 with newly relegated Danish 1st Division team SønderjyskE.

Career statistics

References

External links
 

1999 births
Living people
Danish men's footballers
Association football forwards
Footballers from Odense
Næsby Boldklub players
SfB-Oure FA players
Odense Boldklub players
SønderjyskE Fodbold players
Danish Superliga players
Danish 1st Division players
Denmark Series players